Modern art is a developed from the mid-19th century to the 20th century.

Modern art may also refer to:
Modern Art (game), a card game by Reiner Knizia
The Modern Art, a psychedelic rock band
Modern architecture
Modern Art (Art Pepper album), 1957
Modern Art (Art Farmer album), 1958
Modern Art (John Foxx album), 2001
Modern Art (The Rippingtons album), 2009
Modern Art (Matthew Sweet album), 2011
Modern Art EP, an EP by Chronic Future
Modern Art (illusion), a stage magic trick sometimes regarded as a variant of dividing a woman in half

See also
Contemporary art